Sara Iverson is a Professor of Biology at Dalhousie University, and the Scientific Director of the Ocean Tracking Network (OTN).

Iverson was selected by Mattel Inc. and National Geographic as an influential Canadian scientist and role model for Barbie’s You Can Be Anything campaign as part of the doll’s 60th anniversary. This effort is aimed at helping young girls can have a career in a scientific fields where women have historically been underrepresented.

Early life and education 

Iverson was born in Royal Oak, Michigan.  She has a bachelors of science in Zoology from Duke University, 1979. She received her Ph.D in 1998 from the University of Maryland, College Park MD in Nutritional Sciences. She began her career as a Graduate Research Fellow, Max-Planck Institute for Behavioral Physiology, Wuppertal, West Germany. She held teaching positions and research positions at University of Maryland, Oregon State University, Smithsonian Institution, Washington DC, Georgetown University Medical Center, Washington DC; Technical University of Nova Scotia, Halifax, NS.  Iverson joined the Department of Biology, Dalhousie University.in 1994 as an Assistant Professor and rose to her current position as Professor in 2004.  Iverson was selected as the Scientific Director of the Ocean Tracking Network Canada, Dalhousie University, Halifax, Nova Scotia in 2008 and is in that role today.  She is also a Professor of Biology in Affiliate Professor, Institute of Marine Science, School of Fisheries and Ocean Sciences, University of Alaska Fairbanks.

Career and research 
Iverson's research interests are focused on how animals adapt to and exploit their environments and in the physiological and biochemical mechanisms which constrain or provide opportunities for them to do so. Her research program is inter-disciplinary, combining comparative physiology and ecology with lipid biochemistry and metabolism in vertebrates, and integrating laboratory and field studies on fundamental issues of interest to both zoological and medical communities, as and which also have implications for the conservation and management of mammal, seabird, and fish populations.  Iverson supervises and mentors a number of graduate students both as a Professor and through her leadership within OTN.

Honors and awards 
Fellow of the Royal Society of Canada, Life Sciences Division, Academy of Science, 2018 – present

(As leader of OTN), Nature Inspiration Award to OTN (Not-for-Profit Large category), Canadian Museum of Nature, November 2016

(As leader of OTN) International Conservation Achievement Award to OTN, American Fisheries Society, July 2016

University Research Professor, distinction in scholarship, Dalhousie University, Halifax, NS, 2009-2014.

Killam Prize, Faculty of Science, Dalhousie University, Halifax, NS.  2000.

NSERC E.W.R. Steacie Memorial Fellowship July 1998 – June 2000.

Selected publications 

 The Ocean Tracking Network: Advancing frontiers in aquatic science and management; Iverson, S.J., Fisk, A.T., Hinch, S.G., Mills Flemming, J. Cooke, S.J., Whoriskey, F.G. (2019) Canadian Journal of Fisheries and Aquatic Sciences 76:1041-1051; dx.doi.org/10.1139/cjfas-2018-0481.
 Animal-Borne Telemetry: an integral component of the ocean observing toolkit: Harcourt, R., Micaela, A., Sequeira, M., Zhang, X., Roquet, F. …. Iverson, S.J., et al. (2019) . Frontiers in Marine Science 6:1-21; DOI: 10.3389/fmars.2019.00326.
 Feeding habits of a new Arctic predator: insight from full-depth blubber fatty acid signatures of Greenland, Faroe Islands, Denmark, and managed-care killer whales Orcinus orca; Bourque, J., Sonne, C., St. Leger, J., Iverson, S.J., Rosing-Asvid, A., Hanson, M. and McKinney, M.A. (2018)  Mar Ecol Prog Ser 603:1-12; doi.org/10.3354/meps12723. Feeding habits of a new Arctic predator: insight from full-depth blubber fatty acid signatures of Greenland, Faroe Islands, Denmark, and managed-care killer whales Orcinus orca

References

External links 

Year of birth missing (living people)
Living people
American women scientists
Duke University alumni
University of Maryland, College Park alumni
Academic staff of the Dalhousie University
21st-century American women